OlympiaWorld Innsbruck is a multi-purpose sports facility complex in Innsbruck, Austria. It was opened in 1963. The complex served as the Olympic Park of the 1964 and 1976 Winter Olympics, as well as the 2012 and Winter Youth Olympics.

Venues
The sports park consists of eight venues:
Olympiahalle Innsbruck
Tivoli Stadium
Tiroler Wasserkraft Arena
Tirol Sports Center
Olympic Sliding Centre Innsbruck
Indoor Funsporthallen
Außenanlagen
Eisschnellaufbahn

Concerts
The pop rock singer P!nk performed at the venue on June 5, 2010, during her Funhouse Summer Carnival tour. The Olympiahalle was suggested as the venue of the Eurovision Song Contest 2015, which was ultimately staged at Wiener Stadthalle in Vienna.

References

External links 

Venues of the 1964 Winter Olympics
Venues of the 1976 Winter Olympics
Indoor arenas in Austria
Indoor ice hockey venues in Austria
Sport in Innsbruck
Olympic ice hockey venues
Handball venues in Austria
Swimming venues
Tourist attractions in Innsbruck
Buildings and structures in Innsbruck
Sports venues in Tyrol (state)
Sports venues completed in 1963
1963 establishments in Austria
Olympic International Broadcast Centres
Olympic Parks
20th-century architecture in Austria